Sridhar Vembu (born 1968) is an Indian billionaire business magnate and the founder and CEO of Zoho Corporation. According to Forbes, he is the 55th richest person in India with a net worth of $3.75 billion, as of 2021. He was awarded India's fourth highest civilian award, the Padma Shri, in 2021.

Early life 
Vembu was born in 1968 in a middle class Tamil family from a village in Thanjavur district, Tamil Nadu. He graduated with a bachelor's degree in  Electrical Engineering from the Indian Institute of Technology, Madras in 1989, and earned his MS and PhD degrees from Princeton University in New Jersey.

Career 
Vembu launched his professional career working for Qualcomm as a wireless engineer in San Diego, California, before moving to the San Francisco Bay Area. He has lived in San Jose and Pleasanton.

In 1996, Vembu, along with two of his brothers, founded a software development house for network equipment providers called AdventNet. The company was renamed Zoho Corporation in 2009, focusing on providing SaaS support to Customer relationship management services. Vembu moved to Tenkasi, India in 2019. As of 2020, he held an 88 percent stake in the company. Forbes estimated his net worth at USD $2.44 billion. In 2021, Sridhar Vembu was appointed to National Security Advisory Board.

Social entrepreneurship 
Sridhar Vembu is noted for taking software and product development functions from urban centers into rural villages in India. Specifically, his company, Zoho, established its offices in rural Mathalamparai, Tenkasi district, Tamil Nadu and in suburban Renigunta, Andhra Pradesh. He moved from the Bay Area to Mathalamparai at this time.

In 2004, he set up Zoho Schools to provide vocational software development education to rural students as an alternative to formal university education. A statement from the company states that 15 to 20 percent of its engineers have no college degree, but have received vocational education from Zoho Schools. In 2020, he announced a "rural school startup" focused on free primary education.

Political views 
A former Zoho product marketing manager resigned in October 2018 after a dispute with Vembu over the employee's post on the company's intranet discussion forum. The employee stated that Vembu was hostile to him for criticising the Rashtriya Swayamsevak Sangh (RSS), a Hindu nationalist paramilitary organisation.

In January 2020, Vembu met with criticism after he agreed to attend as the guest of honour, a high-profile event organised by the RSS. Vembu defended his participation as a matter of his personal choice.

Honours
Vembu was awarded the 2019 Ernst & Young "Entrepreneur of the Year Award" in India. He was also the recipient of the Padma Shri, India's fourth highest civilian honor, in 2021. He has also been selected as CNN-News18 Indian of the Year 2022. He was also appointed to the National Security Advisory Board (NSAB) of India in 2021

References 

1968 births
Living people
Indian billionaires
Indian founders
IIT Madras alumni